{{DISPLAYTITLE:B4 polytope}}

In 4-dimensional geometry, there are 15 uniform 4-polytopes with B4 symmetry. There are two regular forms, the tesseract and 16-cell, with 16 and 8 vertices respectively.

Visualizations

They can be visualized as symmetric orthographic projections in Coxeter planes of the B5 Coxeter group, and other subgroups.

Symmetric orthographic projections of these 32 polytopes can be made in the B5, B4, B3, B2, A3, Coxeter planes. Ak has [k+1] symmetry, and Bk has [2k] symmetry.

These 32 polytopes are each shown in these 5 symmetry planes, with vertices and edges drawn, and vertices colored by the number of overlapping vertices in each projective position.

The pictures are drawn as Schlegel diagram perspective projections, centered on the cell at pos. 3, with a consistent orientation, and the 16 cells at position 0 are shown solid, alternately colored.

Coordinates 

The tesseractic family of 4-polytopes are given by the convex hulls of the base points listed in the following table, with all permutations of coordinates and sign taken. Each base point generates a distinct uniform 4-polytopes. All coordinates correspond with uniform 4-polytopes of edge length 2.

References

 J.H. Conway and M.J.T. Guy: Four-Dimensional Archimedean Polytopes, Proceedings of the Colloquium on Convexity at Copenhagen, page 38 und 39, 1965 
 John H. Conway, Heidi Burgiel, Chaim Goodman-Strauss, The Symmetries of Things 2008,  (Chapter 26)
 H.S.M. Coxeter:
 H.S.M. Coxeter, Regular Polytopes, 3rd Edition, Dover New York, 1973
 Kaleidoscopes: Selected Writings of H.S.M. Coxeter, edited by F. Arthur Sherk, Peter McMullen, Anthony C. Thompson, Asia Ivic Weiss, Wiley-Interscience Publication, 1995,  Wiley::Kaleidoscopes: Selected Writings of H.S.M. Coxeter
 (Paper 22) H.S.M. Coxeter, Regular and Semi Regular Polytopes I, [Math. Zeit. 46 (1940) 380-407, MR 2,10]
 (Paper 23) H.S.M. Coxeter, Regular and Semi-Regular Polytopes II, [Math. Zeit. 188 (1985) 559-591]
 (Paper 24) H.S.M. Coxeter, Regular and Semi-Regular Polytopes III, [Math. Zeit. 200 (1988) 3-45]
 N.W. Johnson: The Theory of Uniform Polytopes and Honeycombs, Ph.D. Dissertation, University of Toronto, 1966

External links
 
 Uniform, convex polytopes in four dimensions:, Marco Möller  
 

 

4-polytopes